Cassiano Viriato Branco (Lisbon, August 13, 1897 – Lisbon, April 24, 1970) was a Portuguese architect. He is one of the most important architects of the first half of the 20th century in Portugal. Some of his projects include the Coliseu do Porto,  Hotel Vitória  and the Portugal dos Pequenitos theme park.

References 

20th-century Portuguese architects
1897 births
1970 deaths
People from Lisbon